Roberto C. Cajes (born October 8, 1950) is a Filipino politician. A member of the Lakas-CMD Party, he has been elected to three terms as a Member of the House of Representatives, representing the Second District of Bohol. He first won election to Congress in 2001, and was re-elected in 2004 and 2007. His daughter is Jane Censoria Cajes-Yap.

Biography
As a former priest, he worked as a priest at the Immaculate Concepcion Parish in Baclayon, Bohol; St. Michael the Archangel Parish in Jagna, Bohol; and St. Anthony de Padua Parish in Sikatuna, Bohol. Cajes served as a chaplain at the Knights of Columbus Parish in Tagbilaran, Bohol. He worked at the Immaculate Heart of Mary Seminary and University of Bohol in Tagbilaran City as a professor. He then became an attorney-at-law in Roberto Cajes Law Office in Talibon, Bohol. From 1992 to 1995, he served as the Provincial Board Member, and then again from 1998 to 2001.

He finished his magisterial and doctoral degrees and completed the Bachelor of Laws at the Holy Name University (Divine Word College of Tagbilaran).

A lawyer by profession, Cajes had served as a member of the Provincial Board of Bohol from 1992 to 2001. During his first term as congressman, Cajes, who was a neophyte, earned the respect of his colleagues that lead to his seat as Senior Vice Chairman of the Committee on Transportation and Telecommunications, a seat that is rarely given to neophyte solons.

In his second term, Cajes became the Chairman of the Ethics Committee. During his chairmanship, the committee had caught media mileage as it delved into national issues that shook the country and even affected its economic activity to include the controversial alleged wealth of the first family in a German Bank.

Cajes led the investigation team to Germany to conduct a probe on the allegations against the first family. His leadership in the committee has paved the way for a fair and impartial resolution of said case.

Today, Cajes is the first Boholano congressman to become member of the House of Representative Electoral Tribunal (HRET). This tribunal hears and decides election contests and protests.

In his service to the people he has attained multiple achievements such as: one of the most Outstanding Neophyte Congressman of the 12th Congress; a Legislator par Excellence of the year 2002; awarded by the Philippines Media Enforcers, Inc. as Congressman of the Year; Public Servant of the Philippines for 2002; and the Development of the Filipino Youth Inc. as an Outstanding Congressman of the year 2002.

References

 
 

20th-century Filipino lawyers
1950 births
Living people
Lakas–CMD (1991) politicians
Members of the House of Representatives of the Philippines from Bohol
Members of the Bohol Provincial Board
Mayors of places in Bohol